In enzymology, an adenosylcobinamide kinase is an enzyme that catalyzes the chemical reaction

RTP + adenosylcobinamide  adenosylcobinamide phosphate + RDP

Thus, the two substrates of this enzyme are RTP and adenosylcobinamide, whereas its two products are adenosylcobinamide phosphate and RDP.

This enzyme belongs to the family of transferases, specifically those transferring phosphorus-containing groups (phosphotransferases) with an alcohol group as acceptor.  The systematic name of this enzyme class is RTP:adenosylcobinamide phosphotransferase. Other names in common use include CobU, adenosylcobinamide kinase/adenosylcobinamide-phosphate, guanylyltransferase, and AdoCbi kinase/AdoCbi-phosphate guanylyltransferase.  This enzyme participates in porphyrin and chlorophyll metabolism.

References

 
 
 
 
 

EC 2.7.1
Enzymes of unknown structure